Abidin, Abadin, or Abdin is both an Arabic male given name and surname, meaning "worshippers". Notable people with the name include:

Given name 
 Abidin Dino (1913-1993), Turkish artist and painter
 Zeynel Abidin Erdem, Turkish business tycoon
 Abidin Bey, governor of Dongola
 Abedin Dino, Cham Albanian nationalist

Surname 
 Ibn Abidin, Hanafi Sunni Islamic scholar
 Richard Abidin, American psychologist
 Zayn al-Abidin, great-grandson of Muhammad
 Zain-ul-Abidin, sultan of Kashmir
 Zainal Abidin III of Terengganu, Monarch of Terengganu
 Zulfadli Zainal Abidin, Singaporean footballer
 Mahmoud Ahmed Abdin, Egyptian fencer

See also 
 Abdeen (disambiguation), variant romanization of this word
 Tur Abdin, hilly region of Turkey
 Abdeen Palace, palace in Cairo, Egypt

See also

References 

Arabic-language surnames
Arabic masculine given names
Turkish masculine given names

de:Abidin